Basarbovo Monastery – the Monastery of Saint Dimitar Basarbowski – is a Bulgarian Orthodox cave monastery near the city of Ruse in north-eastern Bulgaria. It has the same name as the nearby village of Basarbovo and lies about 35 metres above the river Rusenski Lom, south of the Danube. 

Although founded during the Second Bulgarian Empire, the oldest written mention of the monastery dates to the 15th century in an Ottoman tax register. The monastery became famous in the 17th century after the death of St. Dimitar Basarbovski, whom St Paisiy Hilendarski talks about in the book Istoriya Slavyanobolgarskaya. St. Dimitar Basarbovski was a shepherd and led an ascetic life in the rocks of the monastery. He died in 1685. He was buried in the village church, but during the Russo-Turkish War of 1768-1774, General Pyotr Saltykov agreed to transfer his relics to Russia. The road passed through Romania. At that time, that region was suffering through a plague epidemic. The legend tells that when the saint's relics entered Bucharest, people stopped dying from the plague. The residents of the town asked the General to leave the saint's body there. Today his relics are located in Bucharest in the St. St. Constantine and Elena Church. In 1937, Father Hrisant settled in Basarbovo Monastery and revived it. The monastery celebrates its patron on October 26th, St. Dimitar's Day. 

It is the only active cave monastery in the modern history of Bulgaria. It was named a historical landmark in 1978.

References

External links
  The Legend of Basarbovo rock monastery    
  Official site of the monastery of Saint Dimitar Basarbovski
  Photos from the monastery Saint Dimitar Basarbovski

Christian monasteries in Bulgaria
Bulgarian Orthodox monasteries
Buildings and structures in Ruse Province
Cave monasteries